The Engineering & Construction Services Division (formerly Technical Services Division) is a Division responsible for providing specialized engineering and construction services to the City of Toronto's internal Client Divisions including Toronto Water, Transportation Services, as well as Solid Waste Management Services. Furthermore, the Division also provides services to external clients such as the development industry, utility companies, and other public agencies.  

The division is divided into three primary business units
Design & Construction - further divided into three operational sections:
Major Infrastructure
Linear Underground Infrastructure
Vertical Above-ground Infrastructure (including pumping stations, Wastewater, Filtration Plant buildings, etc.)
Transportation Infrastructure
Engineering Review
Engineering Support Services

References

 Staff Directory, Divisions & Customer Service

Technical Services
Technical Services Division